Saint-Rédempteur is a district within Les Chutes-de-la-Chaudière-Ouest borough of the city of Lévis, Quebec.  Prior to 2002, it was an independent municipality.

Demographics
According to the Canada 2011 Census:

Population: 7,700
% Change (2006–2011): +10.5
Dwellings: 2,908
Area (km2): 3.83 km2
Density (persons per km2): 2,011.4

References

Neighbourhoods in Lévis, Quebec
Former municipalities in Quebec
Populated places disestablished in 2002